The George L. Brooks School is an historic former school building which is located in the Haddington neighborhood of Philadelphia, Pennsylvania.

It was added to the National Register of Historic Places in 1988.

History and architectural features
Designed by Henry deCourcy Richards and built in 1919, the George L. Brooks School encompasses part of the original walls of the school's 1902 edifice that had been destroyed by fire. It is a three-story, five-bay, stone and brick building situated on a raised basement, and was designed in the Late Gothic Revival-style. It features a slightly projecting entrance bay with Gothic arched entryway and a crenellated parapet.

Added to the National Register of Historic Places in 1988, it is currently used as senior housing.

References

School buildings on the National Register of Historic Places in Philadelphia
Gothic Revival architecture in Pennsylvania
School buildings completed in 1919
West Philadelphia
Defunct schools in Pennsylvania
Apartment buildings in Pennsylvania
1919 establishments in Pennsylvania